A camera obscura (Latin for dark chamber) is a device for projecting an image on a screen, using either a lens or pinhole.

The term may refer to specific large-scale camera obscuras:
Camera Obscura (San Francisco, California), at the Cliff House, San Francisco
Camera Obscura, Edinburgh, on the Royal Mile in Edinburgh
Grand Union Camera Obscura, on Douglas Head on the Isle of Man

Camera Obscura may also refer to:

Film 
Camera Obscura (1921 film), silent German film
Camera Obscura (1997 film), short film by Stefano Arduino
Camera Obscura (2000 film), by Hamlet Sarkissian
Camera Obscura (2010 film), starring Jack Klugman
Camera Obscura (2015 film), Egyptian short film
Camera Obscura (2017 film), American horror film directed by Aaron B. Koontz
"Camera Obscura", a 1971 episode of Night Gallery

Literature and publications 
Camera Obscura, an 1839 novel by Nicolaas Beets
 Laughter in the Dark (novel), a 1932 novel by Vladimir Nabokov, originally titled, and sometimes translated as, Camera Obscura
"Camera Obscura", a short story by Basil Copper that was adapted as a 1971 episode of Night Gallery
Camera Obscura (novel), a 2002 Doctor Who novel by Lloyd Rose
Camera obscura (novel), a 2006 novel by Nejc Gazvoda
Camera Obscura, a 2011 novel by Lavie Tidhar
Camera Obscura, a 1969 short play by Robert Patrick
Camera Obscura (journal), a feminism, culture and media studies journal

Music 
Camera Obscura (album) by Nico
Camera Obscura (band), indie pop band from Glasgow
Camera Obscura (electronic duo), British synth pop band, who had a minor hit in 1983 with the Destitution EP
Camera Obscura (record label), Australian independent label specializing in psychedelic styles
"Camera Obscura", the 9th track in Enigma's 2000 album The Screen Behind the Mirror

Video gaming 
Camera Obscura (Fatal Frame), the name of a camera used to exorcise spirits by taking pictures, in the game Fatal Frame

See also 
Pinhole camera